Kulsum Begum Masjid (also known as Kulsumpura Masjid or Jama Masjid Karwan) is a mosque in the Karwan locality of Hyderabad, India. It was built in the 17th century by Kulsum Begum, daughter of Sultan Muhammad Qutb Shah.

Architecture
The architecture is very similar to other Qutb Shahi mosques in the city. Built on a three-foot high plinth, the façade of the mosque has three arched openings. The two minarets flanking the façade are heavily decorated in stucco. In addition, two small arched pavilions punctuate the parapet wall.

There is no inscription that exactly dates the construction of the mosque.

References 

Mosques in Hyderabad, India
17th-century mosques
Qutb Shahi architecture